Stephen Peter James (born 7 September 1967) is an English journalist and former cricketer who played two Test matches for England in 1998, making 71 runs in four innings.

James was captain of Glamorgan for three seasons before retiring in 2003 after 17 seasons with the club, aged 35. He played a total of 245 first-class matches, making 15,890 runs at a batting average just above 40, with a total of 47 centuries and a highest score of 309 not out against Sussex in 2000which is the Glamorgan record highest score. He scored more than 1,000 runs in a season nine times, with his two most prolific seasons following each other1,766 runs in 1996 was followed up with 1,775 runs in 1997, which led to his selection for the England A team before graduating to Test level the following season.

James also played two seasons of domestic cricket in Zimbabwe for Mashonaland in 1993/94 and 1994/95.

Since retirement, he has made a career as a journalist, initially covering cricket and rugby for The Sunday Telegraph and occasionally writing for The Daily Telegraph. He was removed by the paper just before Christmas 2016, and now writes for The Times.

Rugby career
James was also a successful rugby player with Lydney R.F.C. mainly at the full back position. In a career spanning the 1985/86 to 1995/96 seasons he scored 140 points, including 31 tries, in 81 games.

References

External links
 
 Profile at the Daily Telegraph

1967 births
Living people
Alumni of Swansea University
British male journalists
British sportswriters
British Universities cricketers
Cambridge University cricketers
Cricket historians and writers
Cricketers from Gloucestershire
England Test cricketers
English cricketers
English rugby union commentators
English rugby union players
Glamorgan cricket captains
Glamorgan cricketers
Mashonaland cricketers
Oxford and Cambridge Universities cricketers
People educated at Monmouth School for Boys
Rugby union players from Lydney
The Daily Telegraph people